Violence Against Women is a peer-reviewed academic journal that publishes papers in the field of women's studies. The journal's editor-in-chief is Claire M. Renzetti (University of Kentucky). It was established in 1995 and is currently published by SAGE Publications. The journal covers topics such as domestic violence, sexual assault, and incest.

Abstracting and indexing
Violence Against Women is abstracted and indexed in Scopus and the Social Sciences Citation Index. According to the Journal Citation Reports, the journal has a 2017 impact factor of 1.588, ranking it 9th out of 42 journals in the category "Women's Studies".

See also 
 List of women's studies journals

References

English-language journals
Family therapy journals
Monthly journals
Publications established in 1995
SAGE Publishing academic journals
Sociology journals
Works about violence against women
Women's studies journals
Violence journals